The 4 Man Show was a Pakistani television series that aired on Aaj TV on Sundays at 8:00 PM. It made its debut on TV in 2005 and is currently on a hiatus since November 2013.

Content
The 4 Man Show revolves around a fictitious, parody TV channel by the name of, Channel 4. The show is heavy on news channel satire, especially so on the way interviews are conducted on these channels. The show has mock segments pertaining to news bulletins, on-field reporting and celebrity interviews which are based on the 4-member cast's ability to conduct parodies of a large number of diverse people including news-casters, politicians, television celebrities and sportspeople.

The show also raises issues of media freedom, sexism, terrorism, corruption and sectarianism in an off-hand manner.

Parting and New inductions
In April 2011, some members of the team of 4 Man Show started a new program on GEO TV and Banana News Network (BNN). The show continued with the remaining cast till March 2012 after which it went on a hiatus. 
The show was revived in November 2012 with Ali Gul Pir added to the cast of the show. A year later, in November 2013, 4 Man Show went on another hiatus, probably due to a lack of ratings.

References

External links
Raza Hashmi

Pakistani comedy television series
Television shows set in Pakistan
Urdu-language television shows
2009 Pakistani television series debuts
Urdu comedy shows